Sir George Robey may refer to:

 Sir George Robey
 The Sir George Robey, a pub named after him